Tyler Consolidated High School (TCHS) is a public secondary school in Sistersville, West Virginia, United States.  It is part of the Tyler County Schools district and is located at 1993 Silver Knight Drive. The school was formed in 1993 when students from Sistersville High School and Tyler County High School consolidated to form one county high school.

Clubs and organizations
 National Honor Society
 National Art Honor Society
 Project Pediatrics
 Technology Student Association (TSA)
 Future Farmers of America (FFA)
 Future Business Leaders of America (FBLA)

Traditions
 Spirit Week for Homecoming

See also
 List of high schools in West Virginia
 Education in West Virginia

References

Public high schools in West Virginia
Schools in Tyler County, West Virginia